The Ministry of Justice, Immigration and National Security of Dominica provides legal advice and representation to the federal government and its departments, as well as administers justice, protects intellectual property rights, and ensures that financial crimes are properly analyzed and investigated. The divisions of the ministry include the following:

 Chambers of the Attorney General
 Commonwealth of Dominica Police Force
 Companies and Intellectual Property Office
 Division of Labour
 Dominica Prison Service
 Financial Intelligence Unit (FIU)
 Fire and Ambulance Services Division
 Immigration Division
 Legal Aid Clinic
 Magistrates' Court
 Office of Disaster Management (ODM)
 Office of the Director of Public Prosecutions (DPP)
 Registry Division

List of ministers (1986-present)

Minister of Legal Affairs, Immigration & Labor 

 Brian Alleyne (1986-1990) [he simultaneously served as the Attorney General]

Minister of Legal Affairs, Information & Public Relations 

 Jenner Armour (1991-1995) [he simultaneously served as the Attorney General]

Minister of Legal Affairs and Labor 

 Edison James (1996-2000)

Minister of Legal Affairs 

 Pierre Charles (2001-2002)
 David Bruney (2002-2004)

Minister of Legal Affairs, Labor & Immigration 

 Henry Dyer (2004-2005)
 Ian Douglas (2005-2007) [he simultaneously served as the Attorney General]

Minister of Tourism, Legal Affairs & Civil Aviation 

 Ian Douglas (2008-2014)

Minister of Justice, Immigration and National Security 

 Rayburn Blackmoore (2014–present)*

*Blackmoore served as Minister of National Security, Labor & Immigration from 2007 to 2008; Charles Savarin served as Minister of National Security, Labor, & Immigration from 2008 to 2013; Roosevelt Skerrit served as Minister of National Security, Labor, & Immigration from 2013 to 2014.

See also 

 Justice ministry
 Politics of Dominica

References 

Justice ministries
Government of Dominica